Final boss may refer to:

, the final opponent a player challenges in a video game
Final Boss (album), a 2008 album by nerdcore rapper MC Frontalot
Final Boss (Halo team), an American Halo electronic sports team
Seung-hwan Oh (born 1982), Colorado Rockies relief pitcher
The original name of the PC game ZeroRanger